Bishop García Diego High School (BGDHS) is a private, Roman Catholic high school in Santa Barbara, California. Established in 1959, the school is named for Bishop Francisco García Diego y Moreno, the first bishop of the Diocese of the Two Californias.

History
Bishop García Diego High School traces its roots to Dolores School, an all-girls Catholic high school that opened in 1914 in downtown Santa Barbara. The school was renamed Notre Dame High School in the early 1920s and became co-educational as The Santa Barbara Catholic High School in 1940. In 1959, the Archdiocese of Los Angeles assumed sponsorship of the school, moving it to its present location at the base of San Marcos Pass and renaming it after California's first bishop, Bishop Francisco García Diego y Moreno.

References

External links

Catholic secondary schools in California
Buildings and structures in Santa Barbara, California
Educational institutions established in 1959
High schools in Santa Barbara County, California
1959 establishments in California